C. inelegans may refer to:
 Champsosaurus inelegans, an extinct species of diapsid reptile
 Cleora inelegans, a moth species found in Nigeria
 Culex inelegans, a mosquito species in the genus Culex
 Cymbella inelegans, a fresh water diatom species found in the United States

See also 
 C. elegans (disambiguation)